Mount Lambe is a  mountain summit located in the Canadian Rockies on the border of Alberta and British Columbia. It was named in 1918 after Lawrence Morris Lambe, a Canadian geologist, palaeontologist, and ecologist from the Geological Survey of Canada.


Geology
Mount Lambe is composed of sedimentary rock laid down during the Precambrian to Cambrian periods and pushed east and over the top of younger rock during the Laramide orogeny.

Climate
Based on the Köppen climate classification, Mount Lambe is located in a subarctic climate with cold, snowy winters, and mild summers.

See also
 List of mountains in the Canadian Rockies
 List of peaks on the British Columbia–Alberta border

References

External links
 Photo of Mt. Lambe Summitsearch.org

Three-thousanders of Alberta
Three-thousanders of British Columbia
Mountains of Banff National Park